The Public Service Department, abbreviated JPA or PSD, is responsible for the public service in Malaysia.

External links

Federal ministries, departments and agencies of Malaysia
Prime Minister's Department (Malaysia)
Government agencies established in 1934
1934 establishments in British Malaya